The Porte de Bourgogne tram stop is located on line  and line  of the tramway de Bordeaux. This stations serves as a junction between two lines. It also allows the passage from one line to another through a switch between the two lines.

Situation
The station is located on Quay Richelieu in Bordeaux, close to place Bir-Hakeim.  Line A continues towards pont de Pierre and line C towards the quays.

Junctions
Apart from the junctions between the two tram lines, Porte de Bourgogne stations has junctions with two bus lines (Salinières stop).

 Bus de la TBC:

Close by
 Porte de Bourgogne (Place Bir-Hakeim)
 Les Quais
 Pont de Pierre

See also
 TBC
 Tramway de Bordeaux

External links
 

Bordeaux tramway stops
Tram stops in Bordeaux
Railway stations in France opened in 2003